Independence is an unincorporated community in Henderson County, in the U.S. state of Tennessee.

History
Independence was founded in 1832. A post office called Independence was established in 1831, and remained in operation until 1845.

References

Unincorporated communities in Henderson County, Tennessee